Paul Ballard  (born 9 March 1982 in Essex, England) is an English television presenter and stage actor best known by his nickname 'Des' as the co-presenter, along with Fearne Cotton, of the Saturday morning children's television programme Diggit from 1998 until 2002. He left Diggit shortly before its relaunch into Diggin' It. In August 2021, he was sentenced to nine years in prison for causing the death of two people by dangerous driving. In October that year, he was given a consecutive sentence of ten years in prison for rape, threats to kill and related crimes.

Career
Ballard made his TV debut in 1995, playing a trick or treater who beat up Rik Mayall and Adrian Edmondson in the Bottom episode "Terror". He was next seen as co-presenter of the Disney Club in the mid 1990s. After a change in the show's format, he presented a new Sunday morning slot called Roadhog where he would take a Volkswagen Camper Van, decorated with ears and orange spots, on the road to viewers homes and schools.

He appeared on a one off Daz washing powder TV advertisement, with his older sister. It featured him winning something out of a toy grabbing machine, and his mother criticising him for wasting money.

He also continued his association with the Disney Club which too had changed format and was now presented by Craig Doyle, the twins, Sam and Matt and Reggie Yates (known as Robbie on Disney Club) between 1995–1998.

In April 1998, Ballard and Fearne Cotton launched a new interactive Disney slot as part of GMTV called Diggit.

He continued with the show through until 2002 with a number of co-presenters including Jack Stratton, winner of a second nationwide search for a new presenter in December 1998, and Laura Jaye and Victoria Hickson, who replaced Fearne Cotton in 2001.

Ballard also starred as Smee in a stage production of Peter Pan at the Central Theatre in Kent in 2001.

Ballard's last TV appearance in 2001 led viewers years later to wonder what he was doing now; in an interview his former colleague Fearne Cotton admitted she wanted to know where Ballard was now as they had lost touch.

Personal life
In 2020, Ballard was living in Theydon Bois; on 20 February that year he caused an eight car pile-up in Essex, which resulted in the death of two people. On 14 July 2021, he appeared at the Old Bailey via videolink from HMP Belmarsh, and pleaded guilty to two charges of causing death by dangerous driving. He was sentenced in August that year to nine years in jail.

On 30 July 2021, Ballard was found guilty of rape, attempted rape, assault, criminal damage and threats to kill, after an incident at a hotel in Hatfield Heath in September 2020. He had contested the charges but was found guilty by a jury at Chelmsford Crown Court following two hours of deliberations, with police saying "Ballard has never taken responsibility for his actions". In October 2021, he was sentenced to ten years in jail as a consecutive sentence to his earlier prison term.

In December 2021, following a hearing at Basildon Crown Court, a confiscation order of £553,772 was made against Ballard in regards to profits made from one of his businesses that had been operating illegally. In 2014, Ballard and his business partner set-up a self-storage business on green belt land in Bulphan without planning permission. They also failed to comply with an enforcement notice which required them to close the business and return the land back to its original state. A nominal order of £1 was made against Ballard's business partner as it was established in court that he was an unwitting front-man for Ballard’s illicit business. Ballard was not ordered to pay court costs or a fine because the judge thought there was no reasonable prospect of Ballard paying due to his incarceration.

References

External link

1982 births
Living people
English male stage actors
GMTV presenters and reporters
People from Essex
English male television actors
Inmates of HM Prison Belmarsh
Prisoners and detainees of England and Wales